The Estadio Roberto Martínez Ávila is a football stadium in Siguatepeque, Honduras. It is currently used for football matches and is the home of Atlético Independiente of the Liga de Ascenso.

Events
The Estadio Roberto Martínez Ávila hosted the following major international football events.

External links
History of the stadium

References

Roberto Martinez Avila